|}

The Critérium de Maisons-Laffitte is a Group 2 flat horse race in France open to two-year-old thoroughbreds. It is run at Chantilly over a distance of 1,200 metres (about 6 furlongs), and it is scheduled to take place each year in October.

History
The event was established in 1891 at Maisons-Laffitte, and it was originally held in September. It served as a trial for the Grand Critérium in mid-October. It was initially contested over 1,400 metres, and was shortened to 1,200 metres in 1897.

The Critérium de Maisons-Laffitte was abandoned throughout World War I, with no running from 1914 to 1919. It was extended to 1,500 metres in 1922.

The race was cancelled twice during World War II, in 1939 and 1940. It was staged at Longchamp in 1941 and 1942, and at Le Tremblay over 1,400 metres in 1944. It took place at Longchamp again in 1945, and was abandoned in 1948. Its regular distance was cut to 1,400 metres in 1952.

The present system of race grading was introduced in 1971, and the Critérium de Maisons-Laffitte was classed at Group 2 level. It was moved to late October or early November in 1981.

The event was contested at Évry over 1,300 metres in 1995 and 1996. During this period it was called the Critérium des Deux Ans. It reverted to 1,400 metres in 1997, and started its present spell over 1,200 metres in 2001. The race was moved to mid-October in 2015 as part of a series of changes to autumn races for two-year-olds. Maisons-Laffitte closed at the end of the 2019 season and the race has been run at Chantilly since 2020.

Records
Leading jockey (4 wins):
 Freddy Head – Rimesault (1968), Rose Laurel (1972), Vallee des Fleurs (1977), Rapide Pied (1984)
 Philippe Paquet – Crowned Music (1978), Viteric (1979), Cresta Rider (1980), Zino (1981)
 Christophe Soumillon – Zinziberine (2002), Whipper (2003), Captain Marvelous (2006), Kiram (2013)

Leading trainer (9 wins):
 François Boutin – Speedy Dakota (1974), Crowned Music (1978), Viteric (1979), Cresta Rider (1980), Zino (1981), L'Emigrant (1982), Procida (1983), Corviglia (1988), Ganges (1990)

Leading owner (9 wins):
 Marcel Boussac – Ramus (1921), Nosca (1941), Sandjar (1946), Djeddah (1947), Pharad (1951), Albanilla (1953), Janiari (1955), Floriana (1958), Perello (1976)

Winners since 1978

Earlier winners

 1891: Idalie
 1892: Commandeur
 1893: L'Herault
 1894: Cherbourg
 1895: Champignol
 1896: Fils de Roi
 1897: Artisan
 1898: Holocauste
 1899: Ramadan
 1900: Butor
 1901: Le Mandinet
 1902: Hebron
 1903: French Fox
 1904: Val d'Or
 1905: Prestige
 1906: Peroraison
 1907: Northeast
 1908: Azalee
 1909: Nuage
 1910: Nectarine
 1911: Montrose
 1912: Coupesarte
 1913: Listman
 1914–19: no race
 1920: Cortland
 1921: Ramus
 1922: Épinard
 1923: Carnation
 1924: Melisande
 1925: Apelle
 1926: Fenimore Cooper 1
 1927: Mourad
 1928: Florio
 1929: Le Val d'Enfer
 1930: Indus
 1931: Present
 1932: Le Cacique
 1933: Boucan
 1934: Clain
 1935: Alejo
 1936: May Wong
 1937: Blue Star
 1938: Birikil
 1939–40: no race
 1941: Nosca
 1942: Pensbury
 1943: Turquoise
 1944:
 1945: Tourmente
 1946: Sandjar
 1947: Djeddah
 1948: no race
 1949: Fort Napoleon
 1950: Le Tyrol
 1951: Pharad
 1952: Fort de France
 1953: Albanilla
 1954: Soleil Royal
 1955: Janiari
 1956: Achaz
 1957: Bella Paola
 1958: Floriana
 1959: Djebel Traffic
 1960: Star
 1961: Lebon M L
 1962: Neptune's Doll
 1963: Soleil d'Or
 1964: Sea Bird
 1965: Hauban
 1966: Gazala
 1967: Pola Bella
 1968: Rimesault
 1969: Faraway Son
 1970: Round Top
 1971: Steel Pulse
 1972: Rose Laurel
 1973: Wittgenstein
 1974: Speedy Dakota
 1975: Earth Spirit
 1976: Perello
 1977: Vallee des Fleurs 2

1 Jopp finished first in 1926, but was relegated to second place following a stewards' inquiry.2 Cosmopolitan was first in 1977, but he was placed second after a stewards' inquiry.

See also
 List of French flat horse races

References

 France Galop / Racing Post:
 galop.courses-france.com:
 1891–1919, 1920–1949, 1950–1979, 1980–present
 france-galop.com – A Brief History: Critérium de Maisons-Laffitte.
 galopp-sieger.de – Critérium de Maisons-Laffitte.
 horseracingintfed.com – International Federation of Horseracing Authorities – Critérium de Maisons-Laffitte (2016).
 pedigreequery.com – Critérium de Maisons-Laffitte – Maisons-Laffitte.

Flat horse races for two-year-olds
Chantilly Racecourse
Horse races in France
Recurring sporting events established in 1891